Gordon Mackay (5 April 1969 – 24 July 2008) was a Scottish rugby union player who played for Glasgow, now Glasgow Warriors, at the Flanker position. Normally an openside flanker, Mackay could also play blindside flanker and lock.

Rugby Union career

Amateur career

He started his rugby career playing for amateur side Glasgow Academicals.

He was to move from Academicals to Stirling County. He won the Division 1 championship with the club.

During this time with the Glasgow professional side, Mackay also played for the amateur Glasgow Hawks. He won a league and cup double with them in 1997–98.

Provincial career

He frequently played for the amateur Glasgow District side  and played for a combined Scottish district side against South Africa.

Professional career

When the district sides turned professional in 1996, Mackay played for the new Glasgow professional side in its guises as Glasgow Rugby and Glasgow Caledonians. He was to play for the Glasgow side 17 times. He played for Glasgow in their first European match; a European conference match - now European Challenge Cup - against the Welsh side Newbridge RFC.

Mackay then moved to France to play for Lyon OU. However it was there he suffered a neck injury which ended his rugby career.

International career

He was capped by Scotland Schools (Under 16s) against France and was later to be capped by Scotland's Under-21s against Wales.

Coaching career

He latterly took up coaching again with Glasgow Academicals. He saved the club from relegation in the 2007–08 season. As well as coaching he was involved in getting sponsorship for the club and getting new floodlights for the club.

Business career

After his rugby playing career finished he ran the Jellyhill coffee shop in the West End of Glasgow for several years, alongside his wife Irenne. He also became involved in property development.

Death

He died at his home in Glasgow with a suspected heart attack on 24 July 2008. Tributes flooded in. Former team-mate and Glasgow captain Gordon Bulloch said that Mackay was one of the best rugby players never to have won a full Scotland cap  and another Glasgow team-mate Kenny Logan said that Mackay was one of the few larger than life rugby individuals in the professional era. A tribute match to celebrate his life was played in his honour at Glasgow Academicals and Glasgow Warriors staff Fergus Wallace and Iain Monaghan took part.

References

External links
 Gordon Mackay

1969 births
2008 deaths
Scottish rugby union players
Glasgow Warriors players
Rugby union flankers
Scottish rugby union coaches
Stirling County RFC players
Glasgow Academicals rugby union players
Lyon OU players
Glasgow Hawks players
Glasgow District (rugby union) players
Rugby union players from Glasgow